Amanda "Manny" Ziener (born Amanda Margarethe Elise Emma Lemke; 5 October 1887 – 4 May 1972) was a German stage and film actress.

She was born in Berlin and began her career on the stage and appeared in films in the early 1910s before returning to the stage in the 1920s. In the 1930s, Ziener returned to film. She was the wife of actor Bruno Ziener.

Selected filmography
 Richard Wagner (1913)
 Die große Sünderin (1914)
 He This Way, She That Way (1915)
 Miss Venus (1921)
 The Gentleman from Maxim's (1933)
 Der blaue Diamant (1935)
 Uncle Bräsig (1936)
 Maria the Maid (1936)
 Meine Freundin Barbara (1937)
 The Journey to Tilsit (1939)
 Between Hamburg and Haiti (1940)
 The Years Pass (1945)

References

Bibliography
 Jung, Uli & Schatzberg, Walter. Beyond Caligari: The Films of Robert Wiene. Berghahn Books, 1999.

External links

1887 births
1972 deaths
German film actresses
German stage actresses
German silent film actresses
Actresses from Berlin
20th-century German actresses